Nick Davila (born May 22, 1985) is an arena football quarterback who is currently a free agent. A three-time AFL champion, and three-time MVP, he also played for the Arizona Rattlers from 2010 to 2016. Davila is of Mexican American descent. He is nicknamed the "Latin Laser". In 2017, he was the quarterbacks and wide receivers coach for the Rattlers of the Indoor Football League (IFL), who went on to win the 2017 United Bowl.

He played college football at the University of Cincinnati, after playing two seasons at Chaffey College. While at Chaffey, Davila set multiple school records for passing. When he chose Cincinnati to continue his football career, Davila found himself backing up Dustin Grutza. It wasn't until his senior season that Davila got his first start playing against the #7 ranked, and undefeated, Rutgers team. Davila lead the Bearcats to a 30-11 upset win over the Scarlet Knights, ending Rutgers hopes at a national championship. After going undrafted in the 2007 NFL Draft, Davila tried out for the Cleveland Browns, but never made their team. He was signed by the Spokane Shock as a street free agent in 2008. Davila lead the Shock to a 15-1 regular season record in 2009, leading them to a 74-27 rout of the Wilkes-Barre/Scranton Pioneers. With the af2 becoming Arena Football 1 in 2010, Davila left Spokane and signed with the Rattlers. Davila led them to five West Division championships, five National Conference championships, and three ArenaBowl championships.

Early life
Born the son of Fernando and Marsha Davila, Nick attended Damien High School in La Verne, California. While at Damien, Davila was a standout quarterback on the football team, as well as a first baseman on the baseball team. His junior year, Davila put up what was at the time, the fifth best season in Damien history, throwing for 1,880 yards and 11 touchdowns. This set Davila up with an opportunity to play at an NCAA Division I college. His senior year, he accepted a scholarship to play for Oregon State. However, in the second game of Davila's senior season of football, he broke his clavicle, and Oregon State Head Coach, Dennis Erickson reduced the size of scholarship he was offering. He was a high school teammate of Ian Johnson.

College career

Chaffey College
After high school, Davila attended Chaffey College where he could continue playing football, while showing larger schools that he had recovered from his broken clavicle. In his final game, Davila took a heartbreaking loss 14-21, to the El Camino College Warriors in the Verizon Southern California Bowl. After two impressive All-American seasons, Davila signed with the University of Cincinnati to continue his football career.

Davila committed to Cincinnati on December 15, 2004. Davila wasn't heavily recruited, as he only received a FBS scholarship from Cincinnati.

Cincinnati
Davila joined the Cincinnati Bearcats in 2005, and played in five games as the backup quarterback to Dustin Grutza. He completed 58 percent of his passes for 344 yards and four touchdowns. Davila saw the most playing time, of his junior year, against Louisville. Davila came in to replace a struggling Grutza, and completed 9-of-15 passes for 136 yards and two touchdowns, but it was too little too late, as the Bearcats fell 22-46 to the Cardinals.
In 2006, Davila was once again the backup quarterback behind Grutza, despite the chance to win the starting job throughout the summer and fall practices. After seeing some playing time in a few games, Davila got his first start playing against the #7 ranked, and undefeated, Rutgers team. Davila lead the Bearcats to a 30-11 upset win over the Scarlet Knights, ending Rutgers hopes at a national championship in 2007. Davila went on to lead the Bearcats to another victory over Connecticut, as they finished with a 7-5 regular season record, making the team bowl eligible. After the team finished strong, head coach Mark Dantonio left the program to become the head coach at Michigan State. The university wasted no time in naming Brian Kelly the team's new head coach. The Bearcats were then extended an offer to the International Bowl against Western Michigan of the Mid-American Conference. Kelly made the choice to start Davila in the bowl game, and Davila lead the Bearcats to a 27-24 victory.

Statistics
Source:

All numbers in Bold text are school records.

Professional career
Prior to the 2007 NFL Draft, Davila was projected to be undrafted by NFLDraftScout.com. He was rated as the 60th-best quarterback in the draft. Davila was not invited to the 2007 NFL Scouting Combine in Indianapolis.

After going undrafted, Davila attended minicamp with the Cleveland Browns but did not sign a contract.

Spokane Shock
After sitting out the 2007 season, Davila signed with the Spokane Shock of af2 for their 2008 season. Davila had a terrific first season of arena football, as he threw for a franchise-record 2,935 yards and 66 touchdowns, while leading the Shock to a 15-1 regular season record, and a berth in ArenaCup IX. The Shock lost the ArenaCup to the Tennessee Valley Vipers 55-56. With Davila's stellar season, he received multiple Arena Football League offers, but re-signed with the Shock for 2009 when they were no longer available to him. The Shock beat the Wilkes-Barre/Scranton Pioneers by a score of 74-27 in ArenaCup X. In two seasons with the Shock, the team was 38-3 with two championship game appearances, and Davila passed for 6,798 yards and 152 touchdowns.

Arizona Rattlers

2010
With the Shock moving into the Arena Football League in 2010, and Davila a free agent, Arizona Rattlers head coach, Kevin Guy, convinced Davila to sign with the Rattlers, rather than re-signing with the Shock, by convincing Davila that the Rattlers would "win a lot of football games." Coach Guy's statement would turn out to be true, as the Rattlers began to rise with Davila leading the way.

In 2010, Davila and the Rattlers finished 2nd in the Western Division right behind their new rivals and Davila's former team the Spokane Shock. They finished the year at 10-6, as the 4th seed heading into the playoffs. In the opening round, Arizona matched up against the Shock on the road, but were knocked out, and Spokane would go on to win ArenaBowl XXIII.

2011
The following year, Nick set a league record for touchdowns, passing yards, and also earned AFL MVP honors. He and the Rattlers accumulated their best record in franchise history, finishing atop the National Conference at 16-2. As the #1 seed heading into the playoffs, the Rattlers yet again faced the Spokane Shock. This time they were victorious in their rematch with Spokane, defeating them handily 62-33. With the win, Arizona advanced to the Conference Championship to play the Chicago Rush. Chicago was one of only two teams to defeat the Rattlers in the regular season, thanks to a game-winning field goal by Chris Gould. In a tightly contested 54-48 shootout, the Snakes squeaked by the Rush, to earn Davila his very first ArenaBowl berth. Arizona would face the American Conference Champion Jacksonville Sharks led by veteran quarterback Aaron Garcia. In another tight back and forth contest, the two teams posted one of the best performances in ArenaBowl history. It appeared as though the Rattlers had scored the game-winning touchdown after Nick hit Kerry Reed with a 12-yard reception with 21 seconds left in the game. However, on 4th down Garcia countered, throwing  the game-winning touchdown pass to Jeron Harvey as time expired and stunning the Rattlers. With the dramatic finish, the Sharks earned their first ArenaBowl championship, crushing Davila's championship aspirations. The final score ended 73-70.

2012
With the sting of defeat still fresh in their minds, Davila and the Rattlers were determined to make 2012 (his 3rd AFL season) a year of redemption. Nick once again led the Rattlers to a division crown at 13-5, and entered the post-season as the number two seed behind Aaron Garcia and the San Antonio Talons. They defeated division rival San Jose in the opening round, narrowly escaping with a 54-48 victory. In the 2nd round they faced off against their other West conference rivals, the Utah Blaze who had managed to upset Garcia's Talons the week before. In again another close contest, the Rattlers held on to defeat the Blaze 75-68, clinching their 2nd straight National Conference Title. Davila and the Rattlers returned to the ArenaBowl and were determined to make sure this trip would have a much different result. Arizona faced the American Conference Champion Philadelphia Soul, who entered the game as the AFL's top ranked team at 15-3 and heavy favorites in the match-up. Nick and his squad were not intimated. In convincing fashion they shredded the Soul, forcing them to commit 3 key turnovers early in the contest and pounding them into submission for a 72-54 victory. Nick Davila was named the MVP of ArenaBowl XXV and the Rattlers earned their 3rd title in franchise history. With the win, the Rattlers redeemed themselves from their heartbreaking last second loss in the title game the previous season.

2013
Davila re-signed with the Rattlers in 2013, signing a two-year contract. He led the Rattlers to their 3rd consecutive ArenaBowl appearance. During ArenaBowl XXVI, Davila threw 6 touchdown passes, hitting game MVP, Rod Windsor, 10 times (50% of Davila's completions). The Rattlers defeated the Philadelphia Soul again 48-39, and became the first squad since the 1995 and 96 Tampa Bay Storm, to repeat as back to back Arenabowl Champions. The Rattlers also became the first team in AFL history to repeat as champions the following year against the same opponent.

2014
In 2014, Davila lead the Rattlers to a 15-3 regular season record. He threw for 4,778 yards and 127 touchdowns, completing 66.5% of his passes, and throwing only 11 interceptions, en route to a fourth consecutive appearance for the Rattlers in the ArenaBowl.  In ArenaBowl XXVII, Davila threw eight touchdowns, went 19-for-24 for 237 yards, and threw only one interception in their 72-32 route of the American Conference champion Cleveland Gladiators.  This victory made the Rattlers only the second team to win three consecutive ArenaBowls, and earned Davila the Russell Athletic Offensive Player of the Game award, as well as his second ArenaBowl MVP award.

2015
In 2015, the Rattlers finished at 14-4 with two of their losses coming at the hands of the San Jose SaberCats. Davila suffered a lower body injury in week 5 against the Los Angeles Kiss and missed the next four games. Back-ups  B. J. Coleman and Shane Boyd filled the void at quarterback by splitting the starts and carrying the Snakes to a 3-1 record until Nick's return. Despite this set back, Arizona managed to win their fifth consecutive division title. In the playoffs the Rattlers crushed the visiting Spokane Shock 72-41 in the opening round. It set the stage for a post-season match-up with the SaberCats for the fourth straight season. It was also the 2nd straight season the two teams met in the Western Conference Championship game. Only this time, San Jose hosted the Rattlers due to a better regular season record of 17-1. The game was a back and forth affair until the last minute of the game. Davila made a touchdown pass with 40 seconds left in the game to put the Rattlers up 67-63, but the SaberCats managed a late touchdown with 8 seconds remaining to pull off the exhilarating 70-67 victory. As the new Western Conference champions, San Jose advanced to ArenaBowl XXVIII eliminating Davila and the Rattlers from contending for a fourth straight championship or appearing in a fifth straight championship game.

2016
In 2016, the Rattlers finished with a 13-3 record as Davila threw for 4,198 yards and 110 touchdowns. Entering the post season as the AFL's top ranked seed, the Rattlers faced the Portland Steel in their opening round of the playoffs. Portland was simply no match for Arizona's arial assault. the Snakes crushed the Steel 84-40 and set a record for most points scored in franchise history. The win advanced Davila and company to their 6th consecutive National Conference championship game. Together, they faced off with the Cleveland Gladiators, who managed to upset the Los Angeles Kiss on the road 56-52, the previous week. In the game, Davila completed 20 of his 27 passes for 222 yards and seven touchdowns. Offensively, Nick and the Rattlers were just unstoppable. Arizona's defense was also stifling, forcing  Cleveland to commit five turnovers, and only allowing 41 points. Cleveland's quarterback Arvell Nelson was never able to get into any sort of rhythm, as he threw several errant passes and two costly interceptions. The Rattlers trounced the Gladiators 82-41, en route to their 5th National Conference Championship and a spot in ArenaBowl XXIX. Davila was named the AFL MVP for the third time in his career in 2016. The Rattlers lost ArenaBowl XXIX to the Philadelphia Soul by a score of 56-42. The Rattlers moved to the Indoor Football League after the 2016 season.

Washington Valor
On March 19, 2018, Davila was assigned to the Washington Valor. On April 28, 2018, he suffered a season-ending neck injury.

AFL statistics

Stats from ArenaFan:

Coaching career
In December 2016, Davila was announced as the quarterbacks and wide receivers coach of the Rattlers, who had recently left the AFL for the Indoor Football League (IFL). On July 8, 2017, the Rattlers defeated the Sioux Falls Storm in the United Bowl by a score of 50–41. He left after one season.

References

External links
Arizona Rattlers bio 
Cincinnati Bearcats bio

1985 births
Living people
Sportspeople from Downey, California
Players of American football from California
American football quarterbacks
Cincinnati Bearcats football players
Spokane Shock players
Arizona Rattlers players
American sportspeople of Mexican descent
Chaffey Panthers football players
Arizona Rattlers coaches
Washington Valor players